United States national rugby team may refer to:

Rugby union
 United States national rugby union team, nicknamed the "Eagles"
 United States women's national rugby union team, nicknamed the "Eagles"
 United States national rugby sevens team
 United States women's national rugby sevens team

Rugby league
 United States national rugby league team, nicknamed the "Hawks"
 United States women's national rugby league team, nicknamed the "Hawks"